Cymodema breviceps is a species of true bug in the family Cymidae. It is found in the Caribbean Sea, Central America, North America, and South America.

References

Lygaeoidea
Articles created by Qbugbot
Insects described in 1874